Pleuroceras spinatum is a species of ammonite from the lower Jurassic, upper Pliensbachian period (189.6 ± 1.5 – 183.0 ± 1.5 Mya).  Species of this genus were fast-moving nektonic carnivore.

Description
Shell of Pleuroceras spinatum can reach a diameter of about .These ammonites have a planulate shell with a quadrate whorl section, bearing strong radial ribs ending in ventro-lateral tubercles. The venter is tabulate with a strong serrated keel.

Distribution
Fossils of this species have been found in the Jurassic of France, Germany, Hungary, Italy, Serbia and Montenegro, Spain and United Kingdom.

References

External links
 Ammonites

Jurassic ammonites
Eoderoceratoidea
Fossils of Serbia